Buchanan High School is a comprehensive public high school located in Buchanan, Michigan, United States. The school serves grades 8-12 and is part of the Buchanan Community Schools district.  The school and the community it serves is named after James Buchanan, the 15th President of the United States.  Between 2012 and 2014, the school received local and national recognition for its student-led anti-bullying efforts and was named "Nicest School in America" in 2014 by Procter & Gamble as a part of its "Mean Stinks!" anti-bullying campaign.  Since the class of 2017, all graduates residing within the school district are eligible for the Buchanan Promise scholarship which grants financial assistance towards the cost of attending a college, university or trade school. The amount was initially a maximum of $10,000 per graduate, but increased to a maximum of $15,000 per graduate beginning with the class of 2022.

History
The present high school was constructed in 1922 and is designed in the Collegiate Gothic style popular during that time period.  It is a two-story flat-roof structure with a dark red brick facade embedded with decorative limestone accents.  Additions to the original building include the science wing on the east side, the competition gym on the northwest side and the auxiliary gym on the southwest side.  The school is a contributing property in the Buchanan North and West Neighborhoods Historic District.  The Buchanan Union High School existed at the same site from 1872 to 1922.  A portion of the original building's first story remains standing immediately north of the Ray Miller Industrial Arts Center.  The tower bell from the 1872 high school is on display just outside the main entrance to the science wing.

Demographics
In the 2019–2020 school year, the demographic breakdown of the 580 students enrolled, was:
Male - 49.7%
Female - 50.3%
Native American/Alaskan - 0.5%
Asian/Pacific islander - 0.7%
Black - 3.8%
Hispanic - 2.6%
White - 87.1%
Multiracial - 5.3%

Academics
As of 2018-2019 school year, Buchanan offered three different high school/college dual enrollment programs in partnership with local community colleges Lake Michigan College and Southwestern Michigan College.  Regular Dual Enrollment students participate in college courses at the school's expense and obtain both college and high school credit for completed courses.  Early College Academy (ECA) is similar to Dual Enrollment except students attend college courses during the school day and follow a set curriculum.  Attainment of an associates degree by graduation is an option by completing summer college course work.  Early Middle College is similar to ECA except that both a high school diploma and associate degree can be attained over five years without summer course work. Advanced placement classes are offered online through the Michigan Virtual High School.

The school offers specialized instruction through vocational education as part of the Berrien County Career and Technical Education Program.  Courses and programs of study offered include: Agriscience, Computer Network Administration, Digital Multimedia Design, Advanced Automotive, Building & Construction Trades, Cabinet & Furniture Making, Computer Assisted Design, Machine & Tool Trades, Welding & Cutting, EMT, Professional Health Careers Academy, Sports Medicine, Law Enforcement Academy, and Culinary Arts.

Athletics
Buchanan is a member of the Michigan High School Athletic Association (MHSAA) and the Lakeland Conference.  Past conference affiliations include the BCS League (2014-2022), Lakeland Athletic Conference (1980-2014), Blossomland Athletic Conference (1962-1979) and Southwestern Michigan Athletic Conference (1931-1961).  Athletic teams compete under the nickname "Bucks" or "Lady Bucks."  School colors are maroon and white. Rivals include Berrien Springs High School and Brandywine High School.  The following MHSAA sanctioned sports are offered:

Baseball (boys)
State championships - 1985, 2022
Basketball (girls and boys)
Girls state championships - 1990
Boys state championships - 1976, 1978
Competitive cheerleading (girls)
Cross country (girls and boys)
Football (boys)
Golf (boys)
Soccer (girls and boys)
Softball (girls)
Swim and dive (girls and boys)
Tennis (girls and boys)
Boys state championships - 2003
Track and field (girls and boys)
Boys state championships - 1933, 1999
Volleyball (girls)
Wrestling (boys)

Equestrian (girls and boys) is also offered and competes in events sanctioned by the Michigan Interscholastic Horsemanship Association.

Notable alumni

 Virgil Exner - automobile designer
Hannah Roberts - women's Freestyle BMX World Champion & Olympic Silver Medalist
 Jay Town - United States District Attorney
 Patience Vanderbush - Big Ten Medal of Honor recipient & Academic All-American honoree

See also

 List of high schools in Michigan

References

External links

Buchanan Community Schools 

Public high schools in Michigan
Schools in Berrien County, Michigan
Historic district contributing properties in Michigan
1872 establishments in Michigan